Shlomo Flam (died January 1813), known as the Lutzker Maggid, was a Volhynian Hasidic rabbi and maggid in Lutsk and in Sokal.

He was a disciple of Rabbi Dov Ber of Mezeritch and the teacher of several prominent rabbis including Rabbi Sholom Rokeach.

Rabbi Flam's son was the rabbi of Olesko.

References

18th-century births
1813 deaths
Maggidim
Place of birth unknown
Place of death missing
Students of Dov Ber of Mezeritch
Rabbis of Lutsk
Year of birth unknown